The 2010 United States Senate election in Alabama took place on November 2, 2010, alongside other elections to the United States Senate in other states, as well as elections to the United States House of Representatives and various state and local elections. Incumbent Republican United States Senator Richard Shelby won re-election to a fifth term.

Background 
In 1986, Shelby won the Democratic nomination for the Senate seat held by Republican Jeremiah Denton, the first Republican elected to the Senate from Alabama since Reconstruction. He won a very close race as the Democrats regained control of the Senate. He was easily re-elected in 1992 even as Bill Clinton lost Alabama's electoral votes.

On November 9, 1994, Shelby switched his party affiliation to Republican, one day after the Republicans won control of both houses in the midterm elections, giving the Republicans a 53-47 majority in the Senate. He won his first full term as a Republican in 1998 by a large margin, and faced no significant opposition in 2004.

Shelby was popular in Alabama. A September 2009 poll showed he had a 58% approval rating, with 35% disapproving.

Republican primary

Candidates 
 Clint Moser, tea party activist
 Richard Shelby, incumbent U.S. Senator

Polling

Results

Democratic primary

Candidates 
 William G. Barnes, attorney
 Simone De Moore, teacher and soul singer

Polling

Results

General election

Candidates 
 William G. Barnes (D), attorney
 Richard Shelby (R), incumbent U.S. Senator since 1987

Campaign 
Shelby, who switched from Democrat to Republican in the mid 1990s, was a popular senator in Alabama for three decades, first elected in 1986. He has over $17 million in the bank, one of the highest of any candidate in the country. Recently, he became even more popular in his opposition to the Troubled Asset Relief Program (TARP) and the Emergency Economic Stabilization Act of 2008, as the ranking member of the Senate Banking Committee.

In May, Shelby told reporters "I don't even know who my opponent is."

Predictions

Polling 

Richard Shelby vs. generic Democrat

Fundraising

Results

References

External links 
 Alabama Secretary of State - Elections
 U.S. Congress candidates for Alabama at Project Vote Smart
 Alabama U.S. Senate from OurCampaigns.com
 Campaign contributions from Open Secrets
 Alabama Polls graph of multiple polls from Pollster.com
 Election 2010: Alabama Senate from Rasmussen Reports

 2010 Alabama Senate Race from CQ Politics
 Race profile from The New York Times
Official candidate websites
 Richard Shelby for U.S Senate
 William G. Barnes for U.S. Senate

United States Senate
Alabama
2010